Municipal Left (in Swedish: Kommunal Vänster) was a local political formation in Laxå, Sweden. KV was founded in 1986, as a cooperation between the Left Party - Communists (VPK) and Solidarity Party. It contested the 1988 municipal elections as "VPK/Kommunal Vänster". Later it took part in elections just as Kommunal Vänster. On the lists were Left Party (as VPK had changed name) and independents (as the Solidarity Party branch had been dissolved).

Later KV was amalgamated into the Left Party.

KV published Hammar'n.

External links
 Ruling by RSV on the 1988 elections

Political parties established in 1986
Defunct political parties in Sweden
1986 establishments in Sweden